Marinobacter squalenivorans is a bacterium from the genus of Marinobacter which can metabolize shark oil.

References

Further reading 
 

Alteromonadales
Bacteria described in 2003